Tirhut Railway (originally Tirhoot State Railway) was originally owned by the Raj Darbhanga and later by the provincial government. Its ownership was later transferred to the Government of India which operated it as part of the Indian State Railways from opening to late 1886, as the Tirhoot Railway from late 1886 to 30 June 1890 and by the Bengal and North Western Railway from 1 July 1890. Tirhoot Railway absorbed the Segowlie-Raxaul Railway is around 1920. The Tirhut Railway was merged into the Oudh and Tirhut Railway on 1 January 1943.

The first railway line in Tirhoot was laid from the Darbhanga palace compound (where the place is still marked by the now Kameshwar Singh University) to Bajitpur in Sakri. A second line was laid down from Darbhanga to Samastipur as the first line for general transport in the Tirhoot Division.

See also
 Rail transport in India#History

Notes
Rao, M.A. (1988), Indian Railways, New Delhi: National Book Trust
Evolution of Indian Railways, Chapter 1 - Historical Background

Railway companies disestablished in 1943
Indian companies disestablished in 1943
1943 mergers and acquisitions
Defunct railway companies of India

History of rail transport in Bihar
Year of establishment missing